Thomas Somerset (by 1529–1586) was MP for Monmouthshire, Catholic prisoner under Elizabeth I.

Thomas Somerset may also refer to:

Thomas Somerset (MP for Oxford), 14th century MP for Oxford and mayor
Thomas Somerset, 1st Viscount Somerset (1579–1651), English politician
Thomas Somerset (Northern Ireland politician) (1870–1947), Northern Irish Member of Parliament